John Bell Cameron (16 February 1879 – 5 July 1950) was a Scottish international football player and manager. He played for St Mirren before joining Blackburn Rovers in 1904. He spent three years at the club before signing for First Division rivals Chelsea. After they were relegated, he helped Chelsea to win promotion out of the Second Division in 1911–12. He signed with non-league Port Vale in 1913, departing the following year, only to return in 1916. He briefly served as the club's manager from August 1918 until his departure in January 1919.

He won two caps for Scotland in 1903 and 1904, and also represented a Scottish League XI three times.

Club career
Cameron played for Kirkwood Thistle and St Mirren, before moving south to partner Bob Crompton at English First Division club Blackburn Rovers in April 1904. He replaced Jack Eastham as the club's regular left-back, and played 64 league games for the club from 1904 to 1907. He was an ever-present in the 1904–05 season, before he was replaced at left-back by Arthur Cowell by the 1905–06 campaign. He then signed with Chelsea for a £900 fee in October 1907, who had won promotion out of the Second Division in 1907, and would be appointed as Chelsea's captain. After maintaining their top-flight status in 1907–08 and 1908–09, the "Pensioners" were relegated in 1909–10. Cameron stayed at the club as they missed out on promotion by one place and two points in 1910–11, before he helped Chelsea to promotion as Second Division runners-up in 1911–12; they finished level on points with champions Derby County, who had a superior goal average. He then helped the club to finish one place above the relegation zone in 1912–13. He played a total of 179 league and 15 cup appearances for Chelsea.

He joined Port Vale in the summer of 1913. It was a step down in footballing terms, as proved by the opponents of his 1 September debut – Blackburn Rovers Reserves, the game finished 3–3. He played 32 games in the Central League and helped the club qualify to the FA Cup first round. He departed at the end of the season, but returned in August 1916. He became the first choice left-back once again in March 1917 and in August 1918 was appointed both the club captain and team manager. He largely stopped playing to concentrate on management duties, but was sacked in January 1919, at which point he went into retirement.

International career
Cameron earned his first cap on 26 March 1904, in a 1–1 draw with Ireland in the 1904 British Home Championship. His second cap came against England on 3 April 1909 in the 1909 British Home Championship, Scotland lost 2–0. While he was with St Mirren, Cameron represented the Scottish League XI three times.

Career statistics

Club statistics
Source:

International statistics

Honours
Chelsea
Football League Second Division second-place promotion: 1911–12

References

1879 births
1950 deaths
Footballers from Coatbridge
Scottish footballers
Scotland international footballers
Association football defenders
English Football League players
St Mirren F.C. players
Blackburn Rovers F.C. players
Chelsea F.C. players
Port Vale F.C. players
Scottish football managers
Port Vale F.C. managers
Scottish Football League players
Scottish Football League representative players
English Football League managers